Monroe Township is one of eleven townships in Howard County, Indiana, United States. As of the 2010 census, its population was 1,407 and it contained 560 housing units.

History
Monroe Township was established in 1837.

Geography

The streams of Little Wildcat Creek, Walnut Fork and West Honey Creek run through this township. As the 1870 census, New London was an incorporated town with a population of 240 people, which at the time was much more than Russiaville (at 160). In the 1880 census New London is no longer shown as an incorporated town, whereas Greentown (in Liberty Township) was shown as being incorporated.

Unincorporated communities
 New London
 Shanghai
(This list is based on USGS data and may include former settlements.)

Adjacent townships
 Ervin Township (north)
 Clay Township (northeast)
 Harrison Township (east)
 Honey Creek Township (southeast)
 Forest Township, Clinton County (south)
 Warren Township, Clinton County (southwest)
 Burlington Township, Carroll County (west)

Major highways

References
 U.S. Board on Geographic Names (GNIS)
 United States Census Bureau cartographic boundary files

External links
 Indiana Township Association
 United Township Association of Indiana

Townships in Howard County, Indiana
Kokomo, Indiana metropolitan area
Townships in Indiana